The 2020 Vuelta a Murcia was the 40th edition of the Vuelta a Murcia cycle race. It was from 14–15 February 2020 as a UCI Europe Tour category 2.1 race. The race was won by Xandro Meurisse of the  team.

Teams
Eighteen teams of up to seven riders started the race:

Route

Stages

Stage 1

Stage 2

Classification leadership table

Final classification standings

References

2020
2020 UCI Europe Tour
2020 in Spanish road cycling